Matt Pierce is a Democratic member of the Indiana House of Representatives, representing the 61st District since 2002. He is also a lecturer in the Telecommunications department of the College of Arts and Sciences at Indiana University in Bloomington, IN. He previously served as Chief of Staff to Congressman Baron Hill from 1999 to 2001.

References

External links
Indiana State Legislature - Representative Matt Pierce Official government website
Project Vote Smart - Representative Matt Pierce (IN) profile
Follow the Money - Matt Pierce
2006 2004 2002 campaign contributions

Democratic Party members of the Indiana House of Representatives
Living people
Politicians from Bloomington, Indiana
21st-century American politicians
Year of birth missing (living people)
Indiana University alumni
Indiana University Robert H. McKinney School of Law alumni